Garner Field  is an airport in Uvalde County, Texas, three miles east of the city of Uvalde, which owns it. It is named for John Nance Garner, 32nd Vice President of the United States.

History

Opened in October 1941 with three 6,000 ft hard surfaced runways, (00/18; 04/27; 15/33).  Began training United States Army Air Corps flying cadets under contract to Hangar Six Corp with 305th Flying Training Detachment (Contract Pilot School). Assigned to Gulf Coast Training Center (later Central Flying Training Command) as a primary (level 1) pilot training airfield. Hangar Six, Inc. conducted pilot training.  Airfield had four local auxiliary airfields for emergency and overflow landings.  Flying training used Fairchild PT-19s as the primary trainer. Also had several PT-17 Stearmans and a few P-40 Warhawks.

Inactivated on 30 June 1945 with the drawdown of AAFTC's pilot training program. Declared surplus and turned over to the Army Corps of Engineers on 30 September 1945. Eventually discharged to the War Assets Administration (WAA) and became a civil airport.  Little of the wartime airfield still exists, as most of the airfield has been rebuilt as Southwest Texas Junior College.

Airlines
 Trans-Texas Airways DC-3s landed at Uvalde from 1948 to 1954.
 Uvalde Aero Service ran, from 1965 until 1977, scheduled commuter services to other cities in Texas, and an air-mail route to San Antonio. The airline operated Lockheed L-12 Electra Junior, Piper Navajo and Piper Twin Comanche

Facilities
Its one runway, 15/33, is 5,255 by 100 ft (1,602 x 30 m) asphalt. In the year ending April 7, 2005 the airport had 12,565 aircraft operations, average 34 per day: 96% general aviation, 2% air taxi and 2% military. 48 aircraft were then based at the airport: 63% single-engine, 8% multi-engine, 13% jet, 8% helicopter and 8% glider.

See also

 Texas World War II Army Airfields
 31st Flying Training Wing (World War II)

References

Other sources
 
 Manning, Thomas A. (2005), History of Air Education and Training Command, 1942–2002.  Office of History and Research, Headquarters, AETC, Randolph AFB, Texas 
 Shaw, Frederick J. (2004), Locating Air Force Base Sites, History’s Legacy, Air Force History and Museums Program, United States Air Force, Washington DC.

External links

 
 

1941 establishments in Texas
USAAF Contract Flying School Airfields
Airfields of the United States Army Air Forces in Texas
Airports in Texas
Buildings and structures in Uvalde County, Texas
Transportation in Uvalde County, Texas
Airports established in 1941
USAAF Central Flying Training Command
American Theater of World War II
Uvalde, Texas